Anshan West railway station  is a railway station in Anshan, Liaoning province, China. It opened along with the Harbin–Dalian high-speed railway on 1 December 2012.

See also
Chinese Eastern Railway
South Manchuria Railway
South Manchuria Railway Zone
Changchun Light Rail Transit

References

Railway stations in Liaoning
Railway stations in China opened in 2012